Chinaka Hodge (born 1984/1985) is an American poet, educator, playwright and screenwriter. She has received national recognition for her publications, especially her artistic work on gentrification.

Biography
Chinaka Hodge was born in Oakland, California and lived in various neighborhoods of the city throughout the course of her childhood. In May 2006, Hodge graduated from NYU's Gallatin School of Individualized Study, and was honored to be the student speaker at the 174th Commencement exercise. Four years later, Chinaka received USC's Annenberg Fellowship to continue her studies at its School of Cinematic Arts. She received her MFA in Writing for Film and TV in 2012. In the fall of that year, she was awarded the SF Foundation's Phelan Literary Award for emerging Bay Area talent.

Hodge was also a 2012 Artist in Residence at The Headlands Center for the Arts in Marin, CA. In January 2013, Hodge was a Sundance Feature Film lab Fellow for her script, "700th&Int'l." In June 2013 she began as a first-year fellow at Cave Canem’s summer retreat.

Hodge is in a longterm partnership with McLeod Bethel-Thompson, a gridiron football quarterback most notably with the Toronto Argonauts of the Canadian Football League.

Work and publications
Since 2005, Hodge has worked in various capacities at Youth Speaks/The Living Word Project, a San Francisco-based literary arts non-profit. During her tenure there, she served as Program Director, Associate Artistic Director, and worked directly with Youth Speaks’ core population as a teaching artist and poet mentor.

She has acted in comparable capacities in New York and Los Angeles at Urban Word NYC and Get Lit: Words Ignite. Her poems, editorials, interviews and prose have been featured in Newsweek, San Francisco Magazine, Believer Magazine, PBS, NPR, CNN, C-Span, and in two seasons of HBO’s Def Poetry. In 2013 and 2014, she was featured in two of Watsky's music videos as a guest rapper and writer. She is also the author of the book Dated Emcees (City Lights, 2016), a collection of poetry about urban hip-hop.

In April 2021, Hodge had been hired as the head writer on the upcoming Marvel Studios streaming series Ironheart for Disney+.

Music
Hodge is a founding member, along with Daveed Diggs and Rafael Casal, of a collaborative hip hop ensemble, The Getback.

Plays 

 Mirrors In Every Corner (2010)
 Chasing Mehserle (2014)

Poetry collections
 For Girls with Hips: Collected Poems and Writings (2006)
 Dated Emcees (2016)

Filmography

References

External links

American women writers
Writers from California
People from Oakland, California
USC School of Cinematic Arts alumni
Year of birth missing (living people)
Living people
New York University Gallatin School of Individualized Study alumni
21st-century American women